The 2014 Miami Hurricanes football team  represented the University of Miami during the 2014 NCAA Division I FBS football season. It was the Hurricanes' 89th season of football and 11th as a member of the Atlantic Coast Conference. The Hurricanes were led by fourth-year head coach Al Golden and played their home games at Sun Life Stadium. They finished the season 6–7 overall and 3–5 in the ACC to finish in a three-way tie for fifth place in the Coastal Division. They were invited to the Independence Bowl where they lost to South Carolina, 24–21.

Personnel

Coaching staff

Support staff

Roster
As of May 2014

Recruiting

Position key

Recruits

Schedule

Season summary

North Carolina

Homecoming

2015 NFL Draft

References

Miami
Miami Hurricanes football seasons
Miami Hurricanes football